Linus Olsson (born 11 November 1991) is a Swedish professional footballer who plays for Landskrona BoIS.

References

External links

Linus Olsson at Fotbolltransfers
 

1991 births
Living people
Swedish footballers
Swedish expatriate footballers
Landskrona BoIS players
OKC Energy FC players
Association football forwards
Expatriate soccer players in the United States
USL Championship players